The 2016 Florida House of Representatives election was held on Tuesday, November 8, 2016, with the primary election held on August 30, 2016. Voters in the 120 districts of the Florida State House elected their representatives. The elections coincided with the elections for other offices, including for U.S. President, U.S. Senate, U.S. House, and the Florida Legislative.

Retiring Incumbents 
Republicans 
Mike Hill, District 2 (retiring, ran for SD-1)
Doug Bronson, District 3, (Retiring, ran for SD-1)
Janet Adkins, District 11, (Term-limited)
Lake Ray, District 12, (term-limited, ran for CD-4)
Charles McBurney, District 16, (Term-limited)
Charles Van Zant, District 19, (Term-limited)
Keith Perry, District 21, (retiring, ran for SD-8)
Dennis Baxley, District 23, (retiring, ran for SD-12)
Fred Costello, District 25, (retiring, ran for CD-6)
H. Marlene O'Toole, District 33, (term-limited ran for SD-12)
Jimmie Todd Smith, District 34, (retiring)
John Wood, District 41, (term-limited)
Steve Crisafulli, District 51, (term-limited)
Ritch Workman, District 52, (term-limited ran for DS-17)
John Tobia, District 53, (term-limited)
Debbie Mayfield, District 54 (Term-limited, ran for SD-17)
Dana Young, District 60 (retiring ran for SD-18)
Ray Pilon, District 72, (retiring, ran for SD-23)
Greg Stuebe, District 73, (retiring ran for SD-23)
Kenneth Roberson, District 75, (term-limited)
Matt Hudson, District 80, (term-limited, ran for SD-28)
Pat Rooney, District 85, (retiring)
Kathleen Passidomo, District 106, (retiring, ran for SD-28)
Erik Fresen, District 114, (term-limited)
Frank Artiles, District 118, (retiring, ran for SD-40)

Democrats
Alan Williams, District 8, (term-limited, ran for Leon County Supervisor of Elections)
Michelle Rehwinkel Vasilinda, District 9, (term-limited)
Mia Jones, District 14, (term-limited)
Dwayne Taylor, District 26, (term-limited, ran for CD-6)
Randolph Bracy, District 45, (retiring, ran for SD-11)
Victor Torres jr., District 48, (retiring ran for SD-15)
Edwin Narain, District 61,  (retiring, ran for SD-19)
Dwight Dudley, District 68, (reitring, ran for Group 9 seat of the Pinellas County Court)
Darryl Rouson, District 70, (term-limited, ran for SD-19)
Kevin G Rader, District 81, (retiring, ran for SD-29)
Mark Pafford, District 86, (term-limited) 
Dave Kerner, District 87, (retiring, ran for Palm Beach co. Commission district 3)
Bobby Powell, District 88, (retiring, ran for SD-30)
Irving Slosberg, District 91, (retiring, ran for SD-31)
Gwyndolen Clarke-Reed, District 92, (term-limited, ran for SD-34)
Hazelle Rogers, District 95, (term-limited)
Daphne Campbell, District 108, (retiring, ran for SD-38)
Jose Javier Rodriguez, District 112, (retiring ran for SD-37)

Results

District 1

District 2

District 3 

Jayer Williamson ran unopposed in the Florida House of Representatives District 3 general election.

District 4

District 5

District 6

District 7 

Incumbent Halsey Beshears ran unopposed in the Florida House of Representatives District 7 general election.

District 8

District 9

District 10

District 11

District 12

District 13 

2016 Florida elections
2016 in Florida
Florida State House
Florida House of Representatives elections